Korwin is a Polish coat of arms. It was used by several szlachta families in the times of the Polish–Lithuanian Commonwealth and by the Russian Counts Korwin-Litwicki tracing their origin back to Empress Catherine the Great

History

 

For some reason, an old Polish chivalry clan from Sarmatian breeding, chose raven as his symbol. Perhaps it was their totem symbol because those clans, then pagans, were more ancients than the christening of Poland and the rise of the Kingdom of Piast Dynasty.
Many centuries later, we know about it from a grant of privilege to Wawrzęta (or Wawrzyniec - Lawrence) Korwin z Ślepowrony from Duke Konrad I of Masovia, at Warsaw in 1224, according to Jan Długosz, Bartholomew Paprocki, Count Juliusz Ostrowski, etc. The authors understand the Korwin "proper" actual drawing came to Poland from Hungary, more or less two centuries later. 

The so-called Roman-Hungarian legend of Korwin starts in the 16th century under the influence of Renaissance humanism culture and vivacious contacts between Polish nobility and Hungarian Royal Court. In that kingdom, the Wallachian-Hungarian family of Korvin had flourish in 1400, and a baroque legend argues them descending from one of the Roman gens Valerii. At one time there was in Rome a distinguished tribune named Marcus Valerius Corvus, a Roman general who got the agnomen Corvinus in the following manner: In 349BC, the Roman Army moved against the Barbarians, and before the battle began, a warrior of great size and strength came forward and challenged anyone in the Roman cavalry to single combat, whereupon Valerius stepped forward. Just as he was about to engage the barbarian, a raven flew from a trunk, perched upon Valerius's helmet, and began to attack his foe’s eyes with its beak so fiercely that the warrior was blind. With this, the Roman beat him easily, and from that time, Valerius was called Corvinus (from Corvus, "raven"). His descendant, Marcus Valerius Messalla Corvinus (64BC – 8AD) was chosen to the Roman consulate with Caesar Augustus and the Baroque authors understand he became a big landowner in the Dacian-Panonnian frontiers. If however any of his supposed Hungarians descendants, and a Polish branch of this family carried on the name, nobody really knows… 

It is true that Janos Hunyadi and his son Matthias Corvinus Hunyadi, King of Hungary and anti-king of Bohemia, called themselves "Corvinus" and had their coins minted displaying a “raven with a ring”. The epithet Corvinus was coined by Matthias' biographer, the Italian Antonio Bonfini, who claimed that the Hunyadi family descended from Marcus Valerius Corvinus. 

The Hungarian legend relates that when a raven carried off the ring King Matthias had removed from his finger he chased the bird down and slew him retrieving the ring, and in commemoration of this event, he took the raven as a symbol for his signet sign. Really, this coat of arms was used by Matthias's ancestors far earlier than he did. His own father John Hunyadi, voivode of Transylvania and regent of Hungary, is known as Ioannes Corvinus in Medieval Latin. In addition the Silesian Annals (other version of this legend) tell that was not the king himself who shot the raven but a Polish soldier, who was rewarded with the Korwin coat of arms. Matthias Corvinus was also ruler of the Duchy of Głogów, and as titular Bohemian king (and as conqueror most of territory of the Bohemian Crown), suzerain of all Silesian duchies.

Actually, Matthias Corvinus raised the Black Army which is recognized as the first standing continental European fighting force not under conscription and with regular pay since the Roman Empire. The soldiers of the Black Army were mainly Bohemian mercenaries (former Hussites), but Poles, Germans, Hungarians and adventurers from all over Europe joined as well. Sometimes officers were rewarded with lands and ennoblement. This may be a more realistic origin of the Korwin coat of arms, in Silesia at first (part of the Bohemian kingdom), and all around the Polish–Lithuanian commonwealth later. In time, baroque authors related the old Slepowron coat of arms with then more "fashionable" name Korwin.

Korwin coat of arms can be found on the tombstone of the Chancellor of Cracow Academy Łukasz Noskowski (also Łukasz of Noskowa; †1532), buried in St. Mary's Basilica, Kraków. Image of a raven also appears on the city seal of Głogów from March 17, 1490. A raven sitting on a branch was the emblem of the Corvinus/Korwin family, which ruled in the Duchy of Głogów in the second half of the 15th century and gave their emblem to the city.

Blazon

Gules, on a cut off tree stump laid sideways proper, between two upper and two lower knots stands a left facing raven sable, in its beak, a ring or with the diamond facing down.  In the crest, above a crowned helmet, there are three ostrich feathers.
The book of Polish families coats of arms. Vol. 2, p. 150/151 photo 076, DjVu format in the Warsaw University e-library by Count Juliusz Ostrowski (Translation from the Polish original: Księga herbowa rodów polskich. Cz. 2)

"Korwin I sometimes known as Ślepowron variation - In a red field, a black raven is facing left with a gold ring in its beak; it stands on a natural tree-stump, lying crosswise with two knots on top and two on the bottom. Over the helmet and the coronet are three ostrich feathers. It’s one of the oldest Polish coats of arms, but neither Długosz nor official records from the fifteenth century tell about it. Prof. Małecki writes this coat of arms is separated from the Ślepowron only in the first decades of the sixteenth century (at the beginning, only Paprocki treated these two heraldic emblems as separates). Proof this fact some families that later used Korwin coat of arms but in the fifteenth century were still considered to be in Ślepowron clan, (Kochanowski family, for example). The name Ślepowron referred to the emblem, and the battle cry or call was Bojno or Bujno, as it’s proved in official records. Korwin coat of arms, being a later emblem, had no call."

"Korwin II – Reversing the figures is a common tool in Polish heraldry, which doesn’t follow the general principles of the Western heraldry; there is also an inverted Korwin facing right (instead of the usual drawing facing left). Niesiecki himself mentions it."

"Korwin III – In a red field there is a black raven with a gold ring in its beak, over a cut stump lying across, between two knots on each side. Above the helmet and the coronet there is the same raven with a ring. There are similarities between the crest of this variation and the crest of Ślepowron coat of arms."

Arms derivatives of Korwin, alternative drawings and entitled family versions

 Tadeusz Gajl identifies 13 coats of arms derivatives of Korwin:
Korwin II
Herb Korwin II, surnames without verification on armorials: Piotrowski, Korwin-Piotrowski.
Korwin III
Bieńkowski, surname Bieńkowski.
Chrzanowski, surname Chrzanowski.
Gosiewski, surname Gosiewski. (Is uncertain if it is derivative of Korwin or Ślepowron).
Jaguschinski Count, (Germanized, may be Jagodyński, Jagodziński, Jagusiński, Jagużyński vel Jahodyński).
Kaftanowski, surname Kaftanowski.
 Lisowski, surname Lisowski also Lissowski.
Materna, surnames Macerna, Materna.
 Michalski, surname Michalski.
 Sakowicz, surnames Dyrmejtowicz, Sakowicz, Syrunowski, Syrunowicz, Syrun. (Syrunowki, royal Count)
Terajewicz, surnames Terajewicz, Terajowicz.
Wendrychowski, surnames Wendrychowski, Wędrychowski.
 Coats of arms related to Korwin in other way.
Some coats of arms may be related to Korwin, yet they are not classified as Derivatives properly, on Polish armorials:
Karaczyński, surname Karaczyński.
Korwin-Gałczewski, surname Korwin-Gałczewski.
Korwin-Krukowski, Russian nobility. (coat of arms with two parts: Korwin and Ślepowron).
Przykorwin, surname Joachimowicz.
Korwin-Litwicki, counts of the Russian Empire tracing their origin back to Empress Catherine the Great .

Notable bearers

Notable bearers of this coat of arms include:
 Łukasz Noskowski z Noskowa (15th/16th century) Chancellor of the Cracow Academy.
 Jan Kochanowski, (16th century) Poet and writer.
 Aleksander Korwin Gosiewski (17th century) Voivode of Smolensk.
 Wincenty Korwin Gosiewski (17th century) Field-Hetman of Lithuania.
 Zuzanna Korwin Gosiewska (17th century)
 Teresa Korwin Gosiewska (17th century)
 Bogusław Korwin Gosiewski (17th century) Bishop of Smolensk.
 Krzysztof Korwin Gosiewski (17th century) Voivod of Smolensk.
 Maciek Korwin Gosiewski (17th century) General of the Lithuanian artillery.
 Szymon Marcin Kossakowski (18th century) Last great hetman of Lithuania (also see Ślepowron coat of arms; both of this coats of arms used by Kossakowski family).
 Ludwik Kochanowski (19th century) Baron.
 Maria Piotrowska (Bielecki) Countess
 Karolina Proniewska (19th century) Poet and translator  
 Sofia Kovalevskaya (Korwin-Krukowskaya) (19th century) Scientist from Russia.
 Wojciech Prendowski (19th century) Chairman of the nobility.
 Bogumiła Bronisława Prendowski (19th century)
 Julia Dworakowska (1782–1844)
 Władysław Seredyński (19th century)
 Eliza Orzeszkowa (1842–1910), novelist.
 Maja Lidia Kossakowska (born 1972), fantasy writer

Related and derivative coats of arms 

 Ślepowron coat of arms, royal Count end royl Grand Duke, Bohemija, Polish of Lithuania, nobility coats of arms
 Przykorwin coat of arms
 Bieńkowski coat of arms
 Materna coat of arms

See also

 Heraldry
 Coat of arms
 Polish heraldry
 List of Polish nobility coats of arms

External links 
 Herbarz Polski - Od Średniowiecza do XX wieku (Tadeusz Gajl) in English and Polish.
 Genealogia Dynastyczna/Dynastic Genealogy (Ryszard Jurzak) in English and Polish.
 Słownik genealogiczny - leksykon (Marcin Niewalda - redaktor naczelny) in Polish.
 Ornatowski.com (Artur Ornatowski) in Polish
- Herby szlacheckie Rzeczypospolitej Obojga Narodów (Tadeusz Gajl)
- Herbarz rodowy (Alfred Znamierowski)
- Szlachta wylegitymowana w Królestwie Polskim w latach 1836-1861(1867), (Elżbieta Sęczys)
- Ornatowski.com – Rodziny (Artur Ornatowski)
 Wykaz Rodów Szlacheckich (Andrzej Brzezina Winiarski) in Polish.
 Chrząński: Tablice odmian herbowich, tablica XXII - Mały herbarz Adama Kromera i przyjaciół (Adam Kromer) in Polish.
 Mały Herbarz (Hetmani polni litewscy) Adama Kromera  in Polish.
 Mały Herbarz (Podskarbowie wilcy litewski) Adama Kromera in Polish.
 Genealogia Kochanowiczów herbu Korwin (Witold Kochanowski) in Polish.
 Aleksander Gosiewski and Wincenty Gosiewski (Marcin Gosiewski) in English and Polish.
 Roman family genealogy (Michael Roman) in English.
 Confederation of the Polish Nobility – List of Members in Polish and English

References

Notes

Polish coats of arms